Alba Berlin Frauen (in English: Alba Berlin Women) is a German women's basketball team located in Berlin. It is the women's section of Alba Berlin. The team plays in the 2. Basketball Bundesliga Nord, the country's second tier.

Home games of the team are played in the Max-Schmeling-Halle.

Honours
Regionliiga
Champions (1): 2017–18

References

Women's basketball teams in Germany
Sport in Berlin
 
Women in Berlin